Coxs may refer to:

 Coxs River, New South Wales, Australia
 Coxs Creek (Belfield, New South Wales), Australia
 Coxs Creek, a creek near Coxs Creek, Kentucky, United States, an unincorporated community
 Coxs Bay, New Zealand

See also
 Cox's, a former department store in Pittsburgh, Pennsylvania, United States